Zachaeus is a genus of harvestmen in the family Phalangiidae.

Species
 Zachaeus anatolicus (Kulczynski, 1903)
 Zachaeus birulae Redikorzev, 1936
 Zachaeus crista (Brullé, 1832)
 Zachaeus hebraicus (Simon, 1884)
 Zachaeus hyrcanus Redikorzev, 1936
 Zachaeus kervillei (Sørensen, 1912)
 Zachaeus leucomelas (Simon, 1884)
 Zachaeus mirabilis (Caporiacco, 1949)
 Zachaeus orchimonti (Giltay, 1933)
 Zachaeus redikorzevi (V. Starenga & B. P. Chevrizov, 1978)

References

Harvestmen
Harvestman genera